The Railway Station Man is a 1992 British drama film directed by Michael Whyte, and starring Julie Christie, Donald Sutherland and John Lynch. It was based on the 1984 novel of the same name by Irish writer Jennifer Johnston. It was filmed on location in Glencolumbkille, County Donegal, Ireland.

Cast
Cast members include:
 Julie Christie - Helen Cuffe
 Donald Sutherland - Roger Hawthorne
 John Lynch - Damian Sweeney
 Mark Tandy - Manus Dempsey
 Frank McCusker - Jack Cuffe
 Ingrid Craigie - Mary Heron
 Johnny O'Doherty Craig - Young Jack Cuffe

References

External links

 The Railway Station Man, irishfilm.net; accessed 10 June 2014.

1992 films
1992 drama films
British drama films
Films based on Irish novels
Films about The Troubles (Northern Ireland)
1990s English-language films
1990s British films